The Norwegian Home Guard is the rapid mobilization force within the Norwegian armed forces. Its main focus is local defense and civil support, but it can also detach volunteers for international operations. Its main tasks are safeguarding territorial integrity, strengthening military presence, and protecting important infrastructure.

It has land defense units, and has volunteers and conscript personnel with backgrounds from all branches. 
Founded 6 December 1946, it is the second youngest branch in the Norwegian armed forces after the Norwegian Cyber Defence Force.

Organization
The Home Guard is divided into 11 districts ("HV-districts"), which again is divided into smaller units, typically covering a single county. In a wartime situation Heimevernet will typically be used to protect the local infrastructure and population.

The Home Guard district commanders represent a level of command subordinate to the Joint Operational Headquarters but with territorial responsibility which includes responsibility for operational planning. They also have a responsibility to the Chief of Staff of the Norwegian Home Guard for force production.

The Home Guard maintains contact with the civil community through a civil-military network based on mutual knowledge and trust. The local commanders are responsible for fostering cooperation with the police and the civil sector at local and county levels.

Strength
The Home Guard has 40,000 soldiers all over the country, distributed on eleven regional districts. The Home Guard also has several rapid-reaction intervention forces consisting of 3,000 voluntarily recruited and well-trained soldiers.

Troop exchange 
The Home Guard does a troop exchange with the Minnesota National Guard every year.  The exchange grew from Norwegian American soldiers sent to Norway to assist resistance fighters in World War II.  As part of the exchange, American Guard members are flown to Værnes Air Station and Norwegians are sent to Camp Ripley.  Troops complete each other's training, and tour the area.

The Rapid Reaction Forces 
From 2005, the Home Guard has recruited for a high readiness force with better trained and equipped personnel. It is called the "Rapid Reaction Force". This is the spearhead of the combat force that consists of specially selected, educated and equipped personnel. The force can be mobilized rapidly and is a national resource. Effort strengths contribute to national security.

Soldiers often come from operational armed forces in the Armed Forces and commit themselves to a minimum of 3 years service each and can be ordered on a sharp mission in Norway. They must update and further develop their military competence continuously. They can attend a number of courses, task force missions and other defense activities.

There is one Rapid Reaction Force per district, in total 3,000 men and women. The Rapid Reaction Force is the speartip of the Norwegian Home Guard, and contains flexible and mobile units. It has top priority when concerning weapons, material and training resources. The force is ready to respond within hours to acts of terrorism, bomb threats, and or other emergencies. In peacetime, the RRFs can support the police and civilian community with a variety of tasks, including providing security for the public and enforcing police regulations.

The RRFs are named after operations executed during WW2 by the Norwegian Independent Company 1 (a.k.a. Linge Company):

 Oslofjord HV-district 01: RRF Polar Bear VI
 Oslo and Akershus HV-district 02: RRF Derby
 Telemark and Buskerud HV-district 03: RRF Gunnerside
 Opplandske HV-district 05: RRF Grebe
 Agder and Rogaland HV-district 08: RRF Osprey and Varg
 Bergenhus HV-district 09: RRF Bjørn West
 Møre and Fjordane HV-district 11: RRF Archery
 Trøndelag HV-district 12: RRF Rype
 Sør-Hålogaland HV-district 14: RRF Heron
 Nord-Hålogaland HV-district 16: RRF Claymore
 Finnmark HV-district 17: RRF Ida & Lyra and Delfin

The Naval branch of the Home Guard used to be four RRFs. but the Norwegian government closed the units down in 2017 due to saving costs.

 South: RRF Bundle
 West: RRF Salamander
 North: RRFs Waxwing and Anklet

Platoons 
The Rapid Reaction Forces consists of several different platoons within each district. In this way, each district will be able to respond to any kind of incident that could occur, without having to rely on outside help. Each district (with some variations) will have trained operators in these different types of units:

  (Ranger platoon)
  (Sniper platoon)
  (Military Police)
  (K9 unit)
  (Staff platoon – (S-1, to S-4), transport & logistics)
  (Signal platoon)
  (Diving team – Underwater reconnaissance, explosives-detection)
  (Medical platoon)
  (Infantry platoons)

a Light Mechanized unit has been established in district's 12, 14 and 16. this one is called  (Multi Platoon). These platoons handle the custom made Geländewagen 290 multi III and is the speartip of the RRF's.

Equipment

Until the end of the 1960s, the Home Guard used second-hand weapons from the Norwegian Army. At the end of the period, the Home Guard was equipped with more modern and heavier weapons.

The Home Guard today uses small arms like the MP-7 submachine guns, HK416 automatic rifles, MG-3 machine gun and FN Minimi light machine guns. Additionally, the Barrett M82 sniper rifle and Glock 17 pistol are used. Additionally, the Carl Gustaf 8.4cm recoilless rifle is used by the rapid reaction forces infantry platoons.

The vehicle fleet consists mainly of Mercedes-Benz G-Class utility vehicles, ambulances and Scania lorries. In November 2020, The Rapid Reaction Forces received 420 new Volkswagen Amarok field wagons, to replace the older MB 240 wagons.

Home Guard districts 
Region 1                                                               
Oslofjord Heimevernsdistrikt 01 – HV-01 – Rygge
Oslo og Akershus Heimevernsdistrikt 02 – HV-02 – Lutvann
Telemark og Buskerud Heimevernsdistrikt 03 – HV-03 – Heistadmoen
Opplandske Heimevernsdistrikt 05 – HV-05 – Terningmoen
Region 2                                   
Rogaland Heimevernsdistrikt 08 – HV-08 – Vatneleiren
Bergenhus Heimevernsdistrikt 09 – HV-09 – Bergenhus
Region 3
Møre og Romsdal Heimevernsdistrikt 11 – HV-11 – Setnesmoen
Trøndelag Heimevernsdistrikt 12 – HV-12 – Værnes
Sør-Hålogaland Heimevernsdistrikt 14 – HV-14 – Drevjamoen
Region 4
Nord-Hålogaland Heimevernsdistrikt 16 – HV-16 – Elvegårdsmoen
Finnmark Heimevernsdistrikt 17 – HV-17 – Porsangermoen

Weapons school
The Home Guards weapon school  (HVVS) established in 1947 is located at Dombås. The training centre is providing education and courses for Home Guard personnel, but also for the other branches in the armed forces.

HVVS schools 1200 NCOs and officers yearly, and offers 70 different courses of various length.

See also
Directives for Military Officers and Ministry Officials upon an Attack of Norway
Home Guard

References

External links 

Norwegian Home Guard
HV-016

Home Guard
Militias in Europe